The women's 4 × 100 metre medley relay competition of the swimming events at the 2015 Southeast Asian Games was held on 10 June at the OCBC Aquatic Centre in Singapore.

Schedule
All times are Singapore Standard Time (UTC+08:00)

Records 

The following records were established during the competition:

Results

Final

The final was held on 10 June.

References

External links
 

Women's 4 x 100 metre medley relay
Women's sports competitions in Singapore
2015 in women's swimming